Binhe Lu is a station on line 1 of Suzhou Rail Transit. The station is located in Suzhou New District of Suzhou. It opened with the rest of line 1 on April 28, 2012.

Station

Accessible Information
 Binhe Lu Station is a fully accessible station, equipped with wheelchair accessible elevators, blind paths with bumps, and wheelchair ramps. These facilities can help seniors, youths, pregnant women and people with disabilities to travel on the Suzhou Rail Transit system.

Station configurations
L1 (First Floor/Street Level): Entrances/Exits (stairs and escalators); and elevators with wheelchair accessible ramps.

B1 (Mezzanine/Station Hall Level): Station Control Room; Customer Service; Automatic Ticket Vending Machines; Automatic Fee Collection Systems with turnstiles; stairs and escalators; and elevators with wheelchair accessible ramps.

B2 (Platform Level): Platform; toilet; stairs and escalators; elevators with wheelchair accessible ramps.

Station layout

First & Last Trains

Exits Information
Exit 1: South-west corner of Dengwei Lu and Binhe Lu

Exit 2: South-east corner of Dengwei Lu and Binhe Lu

Exit 3: North-east corner of Dengwei Lu and Binhe Lu

Exit 4: North-west corner of Dengwei Lu and Binhe Lu

Local Attractions
He Shan Garden
Bin He Garden
Jin Ning Ge Garden
Run Jie Plaza
Central Business District of SND (2 blocks away)

Bus Connections
Bus Stop: He Shan Hua Yuan – Connection Bus Routes: 30, 31, 33, 308, 313, 321, 328, 355, 415, 622, Tour 3

Bus Stop: He Shan Hua Yuan Nan – Connection Bus Routes: 325

References

Railway stations in Jiangsu
Suzhou Rail Transit stations
Railway stations in China opened in 2012